The 1999–2000 Kategoria e Dytë was the 53rd season of a second-tier association football league in Albania.

Group A

Group B

Championship/promotion playoff

Semi-finals

Final 

Besëlidhja Lezhë was promoted to the 2000–01 National Championship, with Besa Kavajë had another chance to promotion, playing a tie against 13th-placed team of 1999–2000 National Championship, KF Elbasani.

Relegation/promotion playoff 

Besa Kavajë was promoted to the 2000–01 National Championship, with Elbasani being relegated down to the 2000–01 Kategoria e Dytë.

References

 Calcio Mondiale Web
 RSSSF.org

Kategoria e Parë seasons
2
Alba